Rata Wiremu Harrison (3 January 1935 – 30 April 2013) was a New Zealand rugby league player who represented New Zealand.

He was the brother of fellow New Zealand international Billy Harrison.

Playing career
Harrison played for Auckland. He played in two test matches for New Zealand in 1961, against France.

On 13 August 1962, Harrison was part of the Auckland side who defeated Great Britain 46-13 at Carlaw Park. This was the first televised rugby league match in New Zealand, as one hour of edited highlights were shown on AKTV2 that night and other regional channels showed the highlights the following week.

Harrison died on 30 April 2013.

References

1935 births
2013 deaths
New Zealand rugby league players
New Zealand national rugby league team players
Auckland rugby league team players
Rugby league props